is a Japanese actress.

Filmography

Television
Garo: Makai Senki (Misao) (2011)
Sumire 16 sai!! (Sumire Yotsuya) (2008)
Muse no Kagami (2012)

Movies
Akanbo Shojo (Yoko Nanjo) (2008)
Tokyo Gore School (2009)
Mai Mai Miracle (Kiiko Shimazu, voice) (2009)
Listen to My Heart (2009)
Gantz: Perfect Answer (2011)
Kishibe-chou Kidan: Tanbou-hen (2012)
Muse no Kagami (2012)

References

External links
Official blog 

21st-century Japanese actresses
Japanese gravure models
Japanese female models
Japanese television personalities
1993 births
Actors from Aichi Prefecture
Living people